Sanjeev Anant Galande (born 1967) is an Indian cell biologist, epigeneticist, academic, former Chair of Biology and the Dean of Research and Development at the Indian Institute of Science Education and Research, Pune He heads the Laboratory of Chromatin Biology and Epigenetics (Sanjeev Galande Lab) at Indian Institute of Science Education and Research, Pune. He is the founder of the Centre of Excellence in Epigenetics at IISER Pune and is known for his studies on higher-order chromatin architecture and how it influences spatiotemporal changes in gene expression. He is an elected fellow of the Indian National Science Academy and the Indian Academy of Sciences and a recipient of the National Bioscience Award for Career Development of the Department of Biotechnology. The Council of Scientific and Industrial Research, the apex agency of the Government of India for scientific research, awarded him the Shanti Swarup Bhatnagar Prize for Science and Technology, one of the highest Indian science awards, in 2010, for his contributions to biological sciences.

Biography 
Sanjeev Galande, born on 20 September 1967 in Pune, in the western Indian state of Maharashtra, did his master's degree in biochemistry (MSc) at Savitribai Phule Pune University before obtaining his doctoral studies from the Indian Institute of Science in 1996. He moved to the US the same year to join the Lawrence Berkeley National Laboratory to complete his post-doctoral studies on the role of MAR-binding proteins in tumorigenesis in 2001 and on his return to India, he joined National Centre for Cell Science (NCCS) as a senior scientist. He headed the Sanjeev Galande Laboratory at NCCS till 2010 when he shifted to the Indian Institute of Science Education and Research, Pune as a professor and established the Centre of Excellence in Epigenetics (CoEE) there. He heads the Laboratory of Chromatin Biology and Epigenetics where he hosts a number of researchers who focus their studies on evolution of epigenetic mechanisms using multiple model systems. He also serves as an adjunct faculty at Savitribai Phule Pune University.

Legacy 
Galande's early researches during his doctoral studies were on MAR-binding proteins and carcinogenesis but later he shifted his focus to cell-type specific patterns of gene expression and how chromatin levels influence them which was the theme of his researches at NCCS. His team demonstrated the effect of cellular signaling pathways impact the chromatin levels. After his move to IISER, Pune, he started working on epigenetic regulation on various substrata viz. yeast, Caenorhabditis elegans (round worm), Drosophila (fruit flies), Zebrafish and humans, using them as biological model systems. His team investigate biological processes such as transcription, gene regulation, cell proliferation, self-renewal and regeneration and their interrelations for which they employ genetic, biochemical, molecular and computational approaches. His studies are reported to have assisted in widening our understanding of the development and differentiation of T cells and the impact of Wnt signaling pathways in the process. He is involved in three running projects; Intergenerational programming of diabesity in offspring of women with Gestational Diabetes Mellitus (InDiaGDM), Role of chromatin organizer SATB1 in T cell development and differentiation and The role of Chromatin reorganisers in X inactivation.

Galande has detailed his researches by way of a number articles and ResearchGate, an online article repository has listed 87 of them. He has mentored several scholars at his laboratories in NCCS and IISER and coordinated the National Research Scholars Meet in Life Sciences in 2005. He has also established a number of multidisciplinary academic programs at IISER which covers such topics as biochemistry, molecular biology, bioinformatics, cell biology, proteomics, and genomics and has participated in several seminars on these topics.

Awards and honors 
Galande's contributions to the biological sciences earned him the National Bioscience Award for Career Development of the Department of Biotechnology (DBT) in 2006. The same year, DBT selected him for the Swarnajayanthi Fellowship for life sciences. In 2010, he was awarded the Shanti Swarup Bhatnagar Prize for Science and Technology, one of the highest Indian science awards, by the Council of Scientific and Industrial Research and the Wellcome Trust chose him for the Senior Research Fellowships in Basic Biomedical Science. He received the 2014 G. D. Birla Award for Scientific Research of the K. K. Birla Foundation in 2015. He is an elected fellow of two major Indian science academies, Indian Academy of Sciences (2010) and Indian National Science Academy (2012).

Selected bibliography

See also 

 Wnt signaling pathway
 Gene expression
 Epigenetic regulation
 T cell

Notes

References

External links 
 
 

Recipients of the Shanti Swarup Bhatnagar Award in Biological Science
N-BIOS Prize recipients
1967 births
Scientists from Pune
Living people
Epigeneticists
Indian cell biologists
20th-century Indian biologists
Indian scientific authors
Savitribai Phule Pune University alumni
Academic staff of Savitribai Phule Pune University
Indian Institute of Science alumni
Lawrence Berkeley National Laboratory people
Fellows of the Indian Academy of Sciences
Fellows of the Indian National Science Academy
Academic staff of the Indian Institute of Science Education and Research, Pune